Geard is both a given name and a surname. Notable people with the name include:

 Geard Ajetović (born 1981), Serbian boxer
 Leonard Geard (born 1934), English football player
 Rex Geard (1927–1982), Australian Australian rules football player